The Cuşmed gas field is a natural gas field located in Atid, Harghita County. It was discovered in 1967 and developed by Romgaz. It began production in 1968 and produces natural gas and condensates. The total proven reserves of the Cuşmed gas field are around 75 billion cubic feet (2.1 km³), and production is centered on 20 million cubic feet/day (0.57×105m³).

References

Natural gas fields in Romania